Sang Tarashan and Sang Tarashun may refer to:

Sang Tarashan, Lorestan
Sang Tarashan, Mazandaran
Sang Tarashan, Tehran